Marek Władysław Polak (born 19 November 1963 in Wadowice) is a Polish politician. He was elected to the Sejm on 25 September 2005, getting 6014 votes in 12 Chrzanów district as a candidate from the Law and Justice list.

See also
Members of Polish Sejm 2005-2007

External links
Marek Polak - parliamentary page - includes declarations of interest, voting record, and transcripts of speeches.

1963 births
Living people
People from Wadowice
Law and Justice politicians
Members of the Polish Sejm 2005–2007
Members of the Polish Sejm 2007–2011
Members of the Polish Sejm 2011–2015
Members of the Polish Sejm 2015–2019
Members of the Polish Sejm 2019–2023